Oxygen Park is a public park in Education City on the outskirts of Qatar’s capital, Doha. Located between the Qatar National Library and Education City Mosque to the North, and Education City Stadium to the South, the park has two "zones" – the Western side for sports (including multi-use pitches and semi-covered running track), and the Eastern for recreation (including "children’s playground, an amphitheatre and individual gardens"). The park also includes several water features and distinctive "balloon lights".

The Qatar Foundation commissioned AECOM to design the park, under Erik Behrens and James Haig Streeter as Architecture, and Landscape Design Lead respectively:

The park has been used for community events – such as an annual walkathon to raise awareness of diabetes. From December 2019, Monday evenings became designated as "Ladies-Only Night".

Environmental 
 Post Covid pandemic effect people across the world started realizing need for having natural oxygen parks which can meet the requirement of oxygen for the people in the region
 It is dense mini forest area of several trees planted based on the oxygen emission level and requirement of the region based on people

Awards 
 Finalist: World Architecture Festival (2017)
 Silver: International Association for Sports and Leisure Facilities (IAKS) (2019) 
 Popular Choice: Architizer A+Awards, in the category "Landscape & Planning, Public Park" (2019)
 Silver: International Design Awards, in the category "Architecture, Landscape" (2020)

References

Education City
Parks in Qatar